Qays ibn al-Haytham al-Sulamī was an Arab commander and administrator in the service of the Rashidun, Umayyad and Zubayrid caliphates. Under the caliphs Uthman and Mu'awiya I he served at time as the sub-governor of Khurasan  and the cities of Nishapur and Marw al-Rudh. He was from a prominent Arab family in Basra and was a leader among the tribal nobility of that city until his death after 684.

Life
Qays ibn al-Haytham belonged to the Banu Sulaym tribe, a component of the Qays/Mudar faction. He came from a prominent family in Basra, part of the Mudar ashraf (Arab tribal nobility). His full name is given as Qays ibn al-Haytham ibn Qays ibn al-Salt ibn Habib or Qays ibn al-Haytham ibn Asma ibn al-Salt. The 8th-century historian Sayf ibn Umar names Qays's brother Amr as a participant in the Muslim conquest of Iraq in 634, but this was deemed implausible by the historian Khalid Yahya Blankinship. According to al-Baladhuri, an uncle of Qays, Asim ibn Qays ibn al-Salt, was appointed by Abu Musa al-Ash'ari governor of the town of Manadhir in the Ahwaz region after it was conquered from the Sasanians by Rabi ibn Ziyad al-Harithi around 638. 

Qays was appointed by Caliph Uthman over the Nishapur district of Khurasan in 649/50. Before his assassination in 656, Uthman expanded Qays' governorship to the entire province of Khurasan. Qays appointed his paternal cousin, Abd Allah ibn Khazim al-Sulami, as his deputy governor and left the province for Basra to assess the political situation in the wake of Uthman's death; however, Ibn Khazim, using a diploma he previously obtained from the governor of Basra, Abd Allah ibn Amir, declared himself governor and remained in the post until his dismissal by Caliph Ali. Qays was angered by his cousin's ruse and reportedly stated: "I had a better right than Abd Allah to be the son of [Abd Allah's mother] Ajla." When Mu'awiya I acceded to the caliphate in 661, Qays was reappointed governor of Khurasan by the order of Ibn Amir or the caliph himself. He remained in the post for two years. He was again replaced by his cousin Abd Allah after failing to quell a revolt at Qarin and briefly imprisoned in Basra until his mother intervened on his behalf. He was later made the deputy governor of Basra by Ibn Amir when the latter visited Mu'awiya's court in Syria in 664.

After Ziyad ibn Abihi was appointed governor of Basra in 665, he appointed Qays as governor of Marw al-Rudh in Khurasan. In 678/79, Ziyad's son Abd al-Rahman was made governor of Khurasan by Mu'awiya. By then, Qays had become the leader of the Banu Sulaym faction of Basra, one of five tribal divisions of the city's garrison. Abd al-Rahman appointed Qays his deputy and had him enter the province ahead of him. Afterward, Qays arrested the powerful tribal chief Aslam ibn Zur'a al-Kilabi. During the reign of Caliph Yazid I, in 680/81, the caliph's new appointee over Khurasan, Abd al-Rahman's brother Salm, dispatched his lieutenant al-Harith ibn Mu'awiya al-Harithi to settle matters for him in the province before his arrival. Al-Harith arrested and imprisoned Qays and put his son Shabib in shackles. Qays later returned to Basra where he continued as a nobleman of the Sulaym and the wider Mudar confederation (which was opposed to the Azd–Rabi'a confederation). Together with a Basran tribal noble from the Azd–Rabi'a faction, al-Nu'man ibn Suhban al-Rasibi, Qays was an arbitrator for selecting the successor of Ubayd Allah ibn Ziyad as governor of Basra following Ubayd Allah's expulsion in the aftermath of Yazid's death in 683.

Basra and most of the Caliphate recognized the Mecca-based, anti-Umayyad Abd Allah ibn al-Zubayr as caliph. Qays was dispatched with the Basran security forces to stamp out an attempt by supporters of al-Mukhtar al-Thaqafi, the pro-Alid ruler of Kufa, to gain control of Basra. He died after 684.

References

Bibliography

680s deaths
Banu Sulaym
7th-century Arabs
Governors of the Rashidun Caliphate
People of the Second Fitna
Umayyad governors of Khurasan